Plakobranchidae is a family of sea slugs, marine opisthobranch gastropod mollusks in the superfamily Plakobranchoidea. They superficially resemble nudibranchs but they are sacoglossans, members of the clade Sacoglossa within the Opisthobranchia.

Taxonomy 
Elysiidae was originally  described as "Elysiadae" by Forbes & Hanley in 1851 in the book A history of British Mollusca and their Shells 3:613. In the taxonomy of Bouchet & Rocroi (2005), the family Elysiidae is considered to be a synonym of the family Plakobranchidae Gray, 1840.

The original spelling Placobranchidae, based on Placobranchus, an incorrect subsequent spelling by Férussac (1824) in a translation of van Hasselt's work. Franc (1968: 848) and Jensen (1996: 92) attributed the name to Rang, 1829 (p. 134), who used the vernacular "les Placobranches". Jensen (1997: 180-181) argued for the restoration of the spelling Plakobranchidae, and she has been followed by Wägele & Willan (2000: 91). Bouchet & Rocroi (2005: 133), argued that the spellings Placobranchus and Placobranchidae were in prevailing usage and were conserved under Art. 33.3.1. This view has been challenged by R. Burn and the spelling Plakobranchidae is now preferred.

This family has no subfamilies.

Genera
Genera in the family Plakobranchidae include:
 Elysia Risso, 1818 - synonyms: Actaeon Rang, 1829; Elysiella Verrill, 1872; Elysiella Bergh, 1871; Pterogasteron Pease, 1860; Thridachia P. Fischer, 1883; Tridachia Deshayes, 1857; Tridachiella MacFarland, 1924
 Elysiobranchus Pruvot-Fol, 1930
 Pattyclaya Marcus, 1982
 Plakobranchus van Hasselt, 1824 - type genus, the author have spelled it originally as Plakobranchus, but name Placobranchus has a long time been in prevailing usage. Synonym: Placobranchus Hasselt, 1824.
 Thuridilla Bergh, 1872

References

External links 

 
Taxa named by John Edward Gray